Casey Christopher Matthews (born January 16, 1989) is a former American football linebacker. He was drafted by the Philadelphia Eagles in the fourth round of the 2011 NFL Draft. He played college football at Oregon. He is the brother of Clay Matthews III.

High school career
Matthews attended Oaks Christian School in Westlake Village, California, where he played for the Oaks Christian Lions high school football team. During his junior year, he recorded 132 tackles and four quarterback sacks. As a senior, he recorded 158 tackles, ten sacks, and two interceptions. The Oak Christian Lions posted a 15-0 record as the California Interscholastic Federation (CIF) Division III state champions and finished as the sixth-ranked team in the USA Today national rankings. As both a junior and senior, Matthews was named an all-Tri Valley League player, defensive player of the year, and all-county player.

Considered a three-star recruit by Rivals.com, Matthews was listed as the No. 17 inside linebacker in the nation in 2007.  He chose Oregon over offers from Arizona State, California, Colorado, Georgia Tech and Ole Miss.

College career
Matthews attended the University of Oregon where he studied economics. As a true freshman in 2007, Matthews saw action in the first 11 games including one start against Arizona. He recorded 18 tackles including 11 solo. After suffering a shoulder injury late in the season, he did not play in the game against Oregon State or in the 2007 Sun Bowl.

In 2008 he played in all 13 games and recorded 67 tackles, including 13 tackles for loss and two sacks. Matthews compiled a career-high of nine tackles three times, against California, Stanford, and Oklahoma State. He finished as the team's sixth-leading tackler and third in terms of tackles for loss, with 13.0 for 44 yards. College Football News included him among their "120 Players To Know" and wrote that he is "fundamentally sound, he diagnoses plays well and has a knack for filling the proper lane, a couple of keys to being a successful inside linebacker." Matthews participated in the 2011 BCS National Championship Game, where Oregon lost to Auburn, 22–19. Matthews recorded a forced fumble against Heisman Trophy winner, Cam Newton, which led to a game-tying score late in the fourth quarter.

Matthews finished his college career at the University of Oregon with 50 games played, 245 tackles, nine sacks and four interceptions.

Professional career

Pre-draft
Matthews was projected to be drafted in the fourth round of the 2011 NFL Draft.

Philadelphia Eagles
Matthews was selected by the Philadelphia Eagles in the fourth round (116th overall) of the 2011 NFL Draft. He was signed to a four-year contract on July 27, 2011. He opened the 2011 NFL season as the Eagles' starting middle linebacker.  He became the Eagles starting nickel-linebacker before the Eagles Week 14 game at Miami. He recorded his first career sack in that same game.

Minnesota Vikings
Matthews was signed by the Minnesota Vikings as a free agent on March 24, 2015. He sustained a hip labrum injury that required surgery and was placed on injured reserve.

Personal life

Matthews was born in Northridge, California to parents Clay and Leslie Matthews. His father Clay Matthews, Jr. played football as an All-American at USC and had a 19-year professional football career in the National Football League. His grandfather Clay Matthews, Sr. and uncle Bruce Matthews both played in the NFL, as well as his brother Clay Matthews III.  He also has cousins involved in football: Kevin Matthews was a center for the Tennessee Titans, Jake Matthews is an offensive tackle for the Atlanta Falcons and Mike Matthews was a center for the Cleveland Browns.

Casey married his high school sweetheart Alyssa Grillo on July 14, 2012. They have two children.

References

External links
 
 Oregon Ducks bio
 NFL Combine profile

1989 births
Living people
American football linebackers
Matthews football family
Minnesota Vikings players
Oregon Ducks football players
People from Agoura Hills, California
People from Northridge, Los Angeles
Philadelphia Eagles players
Players of American football from California
Sportspeople from Los Angeles County, California